is a Japanese former competitive figure skater. She is the 1986 Asian Winter Games silver medalist and 1984 Japanese national champion. She placed 19th at the 1984 Winter Olympics.

Results

References

1965 births
Living people
Japanese female single skaters
Olympic figure skaters of Japan
Figure skaters at the 1984 Winter Olympics
Sportspeople from Tokyo
Asian Games medalists in figure skating
Figure skaters at the 1986 Asian Winter Games

Medalists at the 1986 Asian Winter Games
Asian Games silver medalists for Japan